Revolutionary Communist Youth may refer to:

Revolutionary Communist Youth (Argentina)
Revolutionary Communist Youth (Norway)
Revolutionary Communist Youth (Sweden)
 Jeunesse communiste révolutionnaire, a French Trotskyist organisation founded after the dissolution of the Union of Communist Students